Pettend is a village in Szigetvári district of Baranya County, Hungary. As of 2012 it had a population of 149.

Pettend lies to the south of the confluence of the Szigetvár and Kistamási rivers.

History 
The first mention of Pettend was in 1330, spelled Petend, and assigned to the estate of Peter Siklosi. In 1449 the land was divided between three families of landed gentry, Thuz, Letai, and  Szőcsényi. In 1493 the estate was bought by Mihályné Kornis, that is, the wife of Mihály Kornis. In the 18th century, Count Laszló Nádasdy inhabited the area. In the 20th century, with changes in boundaries, it became part of Somogy County.

Notable people 
 Györffy György

References

Towns in Hungary
Populated places in Baranya County